The Senckenberg German Entomological Institute (SDEI or DEI) is a German entomological research institute devoted to the study of insects. Founded in 1886, the institute has an extraordinary insect collection and a world-class entomological library. Since 2009, the SDEI has been part of the Senckenberg Nature Research Society.

Insect collections

The department of Phylogenetic Systematics and Taxonomy of Insects maintains about 3 million pinned insects and uncounted specimens in the wet collection, among others the collections of:

Rudolf von Bennigsen (1824-1902)
Karl Bleyl (1908-1995)
Carl Julius Bernhard Börner (1880-1953)
Peter Friedrich Bouché (1784-1856)
Gustav Breddin (1864-1909)
Adolf Willy Lothar Dieckmann (1920-1990)
Karl Friedrich Ermisch (1898-1970)
Karl Flach (1856-1920)
Gerrit Friese (1931-1990)
Johann Georg Haag-Rutenberg (1830-1880)
Lucas Friedrich Julius Dominikus von Heyden (1838-1915)
Walther Hermann Richard Horn (1871-1939)
Carl Friedrich Ketel (1861-1906)
Hermann Kläger (1847-1923)
Hermann Albert Friedrich Köller (1885-1968)
Wilhelm Koltze (1839-1914)
Ernst Gustav Kraatz (1831-1909)
Friedrich Wilhelm Konow (1842-1908)
Karl Friedrich Lange (1844-1913)
Otto Leonhard (1853-1929)
Karl Wilhelm Letzner (1812-1889)
Bernhardt Lichtwardt (1857-1943)
Walter Liebmann (1885-1974)
Gustav Adolf Lohse (1910-1994)
Axel Leonard Melander (1878-1962)
Julius Melzer (1878-1934)
Wilhelm Mink (1807-1883)
Karl-Heinz Mohr (1925-1989)
Julius Neresheimer (1880-1943)
Heinrich von Oettingen (1878-1956)
Lorenz Oldenberg (1863-1931)
Carl Robert Osten-Sacken (1828-1906)
Gustav Paganetti-Hummler (1871-1949)
Paul Pape (1859-1933)
Helmuth Patzak (1927-1988)
Ernst Pietsch (1872-1930)
Karl Ritter (1909-1998)
William Henry Rolph (1847-1883)
Arthur Leopold Albert Maria Rottenberg (1843-1875)
Max Saalmüller (1832-1890)
Johann Christian Rudolf Sachse (1802-1891)
Hans Sauter (1871-1948)
Ludwig Wilhelm Schaufuss (1833-1890)
Karl Gotthilf Schenkling (1835-1911)
Sigmund Schenkling (1865-1946)

Entomological Information Center

The Entomology Information Center keeps: 
 24,000 monographies, anthologies
 48,000 volumes of periodicals of about 2.400 journals and series (titles), among them 850 current serial journals
 118,000 separata
 1,500 further media (maps, films, CDs, CD-ROMs, DVDs, VHS)

The archives are also associated here, which comprise: 
 120 bequests of entomologists
 a collection of 6000 portraits including photographs, engravings, prints, and press clippings of entomologists
 a collection of objects related to entomology, such as postcards, small figurines, or costume jewellery

See also
 Entomological Society of Stettin

External links
 Official website
 DEZ History

References

1886 establishments in Germany
Entomological organizations
Biology societies
Research institutes in Germany
Scientific organizations established in 1886